The Hungate Baronetcy, of Saxton in the County of York, was a title in the Baronetage of England.  It was created on 15 August 1642 for Philip Hungate.  The title became extinct on the death of the sixth Baronet in 1749.

Hungate baronets, of Saxton (1642)
Sir Philip Hungate, 1st Baronet (died 1655)
Sir Francis Hungate, 2nd Baronet (1643–1666)
Sir Philip Hungate, 3rd Baronet (1661–1690)
Sir Francis Hungate, 4th Baronet (1683–1710)
Sir Philip Hungate, 5th Baronet (c. 1685 – c. 1740)
Sir Charles Carrington Hungate, 6th Baronet (1686–1749)

References

Extinct baronetcies in the Baronetage of England